Veshtegan (also Romanized as Veshtegān; also known as Nāgān, Vāīski Nāgūn, Veshgān, Veshtakān, and Veshtekān) is a village in Jasb Rural District, in the Central District of Delijan County, Markazi Province, Iran. At the 2006 census, its population was 90, in 32 families.

References 

Populated places in Delijan County